Dragoslav Pejić (1929 – 1 September 2016) served as a Yugoslav diplomat. He served as the Yugoslav ambassador to the United Nations between 1985–1989. Pejic served as the President of the United Nations Security Council on two occasions. The first time he chaired the security council was in March 1988. He was president again in July 1989.

See also
Yugoslavia and the United Nations

References

1929 births
2016 deaths
Permanent Representatives of Yugoslavia to the United Nations